Hearthstone is a digital collectible card game released by Blizzard Entertainment in 2014, available for Microsoft Windows and macOS PCs and iOS and Android smartphones. The game is free-to-play, with players gaining in-game currency and card packs via winning matches and completing quests, while real-world money can be spent to acquire additional card packs and cosmetic items. , Blizzard has reported more than 100 million Hearthstone players. Blizzard has continued to expand the game with the addition of multiple expansions, adventures and game modes.

Gameplay
Hearthstone is a digital-only collectible card game that revolves around turn-based matches between two opponents using pre-made decks of cards. Players can choose from a number of game modes, with each offering a slightly different experience. Players start the game with a limited collection of basic cards but can gain rarer and more powerful cards through purchasing packs of cards or as rewards from specific game modes. Hearthstone is purposely designed to exclude card trading, while allowing players to disenchant unwanted cards into a quantity of arcane dust that can then be used to craft new cards of the player's choice. Players customize their decks with any gained cards to improve their chances of winning and gaining further rewards.

Hearthstone is free-to-play, only requiring the player to download the game client for their computer or device after setting up a free Battle.net account; supporting the ongoing development of the game comes from micropayments. Players can earn in-game gold by winning play mode matches and completing daily quests, such as winning a certain number of matches while in play mode with a particular hero class. A player can have up to three active daily quests, which carry over until completed or the quest is declined by the player; a new daily quest is given once a day. Gold can be used for booster packs, entry tickets for arena and access to adventure wings. Alternatively, players can spend real money to purchase these items directly, and can buy exclusive card back skins and alternate heroes. During the week before the Journey to Un'Goro expansion released in April 2017, Blizzard temporarily added daily log-in rewards that included gold, arcane dust for card crafting, card packs, and individual cards.

Hearthstone is set within the Warcraft universe, with its characters, spells and locations drawing mostly from existing lore. The game has a few original characters like Sir Finley Mrrgglton, Morgl, Elise Starseeker, Patches the Pirate, and Skycap'n Kragg that were later added to World of Warcraft. Additionally, Hearthstone reveals the image of many characters only hinted at within the lore of World of Warcraft such as the Old Gods N'Zoth and Y'Shaarj as well as Shirvallah, the Tiger.

Matches
Each Hearthstone match is a one-versus-one battle between two opponents. Gameplay in Hearthstone is turn-based, with players taking turns to play cards from their hand, limited by available mana, that include casting spells, equipping weapons, summoning minions to do battle on their behalf or replacing a player's chosen hero with a Death Knight hero. Hearthstone does not allow the opposing player to react to any of the current player's actions as a means to speed up gameplay; there are some special cards known as Secrets that prepare an action that is automatically performed by the game for the opposing player if a condition is triggered, such as if a minion attacks their hero. Games may be between two players, or one player and one computer-controlled opponent.

Each player is represented by a 'hero', a character from Warcraft lore representing one of ten specific classes. The classes are defined by their unique hero power that can be used once-per-turn in matches (some cards may affect the number of times this can be used), and the selection of class-specific cards that the player uses to construct the hero's deck. The ten available classes, along with their hero names, are:

 Mage (Jaina Proudmoore, Medivh, Khadgar, Kel'Thuzad, Lady Katrana Prestor, Queen Azshara, or Kael'thas Sunstrider),

 Priest (Anduin Wrynn, Tyrande Whisperwind or Madame Lazul)

 Warlock (Gul'dan, Nemsy Necrofizzle, Mecha-Jaraxxus or N'Zoth)

 Paladin (Uther the Lightbringer, Lady Liadrin, Sir Annoy-O, Arthas Menethil, Yrel, Leeroy Jenkins, or Sir Finley Mrrgglton)

 Warrior (Garrosh Hellscream, Magni Bronzebeard, Deathwing, Annhylde, Vanndar Stormpike, Sire Denathrius, or Prince Renathal)

 Druid (Malfurion Stormrage, Lunara, Dame Hazelbark, Elise Starseeker, Hamuul Runetotem, Xuen or Ambassador Faelin),

 Hunter (Rexxar, Alleria Windrunner or Sylvanas Windrunner),

 Rogue (Valeera Sanguinar, Maiev Shadowsong, Edwin VanCleef or Garona Halforcen),

 Shaman (Thrall, Morgl the Oracle, King Rastakhan, The Thunder King, Lady Vashj, or Ragnaros)

 Demon Hunter (Illidan Stormrage or Aranna Starseeker)

In some of the game modes, such as Adventures or Tavern Brawls, the player may play or face against a non-standard hero or enemy with a pre-built deck and a unique hero power which are not available outside of these game modes.

At the start of the match, each player draws cards from their respective deck of thirty cards after it is shuffled. One player is randomly selected to go first. The first player draws three cards while the second player draws four. Players have the option to mulligan any of the cards in their starting hand, with replacements coming from the rest of their deck. At the end of the mulligan, the second player gets a card called "The Coin," a spell that gives a mana crystal at any point during a player's turn. Despite the second player's two card advantage, game director Ben Brode claims that on average the first player has a 3% higher chance to win, and Ars Technicas analysis of three professional tournaments found only an insignificant advantage for the first player. Each player subsequently starts with no existing mana crystals.

Players then proceed to alternate turns. At the start of each turn, all empty mana crystals for a player are refilled and they gain a new filled mana crystal, up to a maximum of ten. If a card with an Overload keyword is played, this will limit the number of available mana crystals during the following turn. The player then is required to draw a card from their deck; if they have run out of cards, their hero takes an increasing amount of damage on each successive draw, called Fatigue. During their turn, each player may choose to play any of their cards, use their hero power, or direct attacks against the opposing hero and their minions. Nearly all cards and hero powers cost a number of mana points, and the player must have at least that many filled mana crystals to perform that action, which then drains those crystals until their next turn. Unlike card games like Magic: The Gathering, the opposing player has no means to interrupt or counter the current player's action during their turns, though some card effects can be triggered by the other player's actions and are automatically handled by the game. Each player's turn is limited by a timer, pausing only during card animations; the player is warned when this countdown is nearly over by displaying a burning rope. If the countdown ends before they complete their turn, they forgo any further actions and their turn ends. Players can end their turn at any time before this, and the game will indicate to the player when they have exhausted all possible actions for a turn to allow them to end it early.

Heroes typically start a match with 30 health points. Some cards and hero powers allow the hero to gain a number of points of armor, with no limit, or heal up to the maximum health for their hero. Any attack damage dealt to the hero first depletes the armor value and it must reach zero before damage can be done to the hero's health. A match is concluded when one or both players have reached zero health, when a player chooses to concede or when the maximum number of turns, 45 turns for both players, is reached. Completing a match will grant each player experience for that hero class. The amount of experience gained is dependent on the game mode, whether the opponent was computer or player-controlled, how many turns the game lasted and whether the match was won. Leveling hero classes grants the player access to additional Core cards up to level 10 for that class, and leveling all classes up to a sum of 60 will award the player all neutral Core cards, usable by all classes.

Each match takes place on a randomly selected battlefield, representing the board on which the game is played. Several of the battlefields are inspired by the lore of Warcraft or based on the game's expansions. Each battlefield features its own design and many interactive elements, but the gameplay is in no way affected or determined by battlefield selection; the differences are purely cosmetic. Around the battlefield are the game's important user interface elements, which are each player's hand, deck, hero portrait, hero power, mana crystals, the log of recent cards played and actions taken and each hero's summoned minions. At any time, players can select or mouse-over face-up cards to get more details on their effects including definitions of keywords. The player may use six pre-set emotes to communicate with their opponent. Text-based messages may be exchanged with the opponent if they are part of the player's Battle.net friends list. Players may observe and send messages to their Battle.net friends while the friend is playing a match.

Card categories
Cards are the main substance of Hearthstone, representing the abilities, characters and effects each player is able to make use of during the match. Cards fall into five broad categories: minion cards to summon minions into the game, spell cards that create some type of immediate effect, equippable weapons that enable the hero character to attack directly, hero cards that transform the basic hero into a different one, and locations with activatable effects every other turn. All cards have a mana cost that must be provided by the available mana the player has for that turn.

Once summoned, minion cards each have an attack and a health value; when a minion attacks a target, it will deal its attack value to that target's health, and if it is attacking a minion, it will take damage based on the defending minion's attack value. A minion's health does not regenerate at the start of the player's next turn, so minions can be destroyed after taking smaller amounts of damage over several turns. Minions normally cannot attack the turn they are put into play, and once in play, they can normally attack once per turn. Some keywords affect the behavior of minions from these basic rules: examples include those with "Taunt" that must be destroyed before any other minion without taunt or the opposing hero can be attacked, those with "Charge" can attack the turn they are brought into play, and those with "Windfury" can attack twice per turn. Other keywords define actions to be taken at specific events: minions may have "Battlecry" events that only trigger when they are played from a player's hand, "Deathrattle" events that occur when the minion is killed, and many more. Tooltips are provided for all keywords, and interactions of minions and their keywords are often crucial to success in matches.

Minion positioning on the game board can be important as some minions and spells will affect adjacent minions. Minions may belong to a specific tribe such as "Beast", "Demon", "Murloc", "Pirate", "Mech", or "Elemental", as labeled on the card. Some cards can be influenced by or can influence minions in play or in the player's hand that belong to that specific tribe.

Spell cards can be used for example to cause damage to the opposing hero or their minions, apply buffs or debuffs to minions or draw additional cards from their deck. As a digital-only game, some of Hearthstones spells can also be used by the player to pull in cards from the entire available Hearthstone library that meets certain requirements, even if they do not own these cards. Spell effects may last for only a turn or may be permanent on the card it affects as long as it stays in play. Buffs or debuffs can be silenced to remove all effects from a card.

Equippable weapons have an attack value and durability value. When equipped, the player can direct their hero to attack as if they were a minion; the hero's attack value will be that of the weapon, and the hero will take damage if he attacks a minion. The weapon's durability drops by one after the attack, as well as through other card effects, and if it drops to zero, the weapon is unable to be used to attack and is usually destroyed. Usually, weapon attacks can only be used once a turn.

Hero cards, introduced in the Knights of the Frozen Throne expansion, transform a player's hero into a Legendary hero with a different hero power, which is related to the replaced hero's power.

Locations, introduced in the Murder at Castle Nathria expansion, depict different locations within the Warcraft universe. Locations only have a durability value, and each one has a unique ability described by its card text. Locations are summoned to the battlefield like minions, and their ability can be used by clicking or clicking and dragging the location, depending on its ability. When a location's ability is used, the location loses 1 durability, and the ability goes on a cooldown of 1 turn where it cannot be used. Once a location's durability reaches 0, it is destroyed.

At times, Blizzard has altered the attributes and effects of certain cards after their release based on observations from gameplay, to prevent unforeseen game-breaking combination attacks or effects that would be over-used by players. Many of these changes are "nerfs", reducing the effectiveness of the card's ability, while there have also been some "revamp" that may improve cards. These changes are retroactive, affecting all existing cards owned by players. When a card has been directly changed, players are offered a full refund of the arcane dust crafting cost for two weeks if the player chooses to disenchant the affected cards.

Decks
In all game modes except Arena, Battlegrounds some parts of Adventure mode and certain weekly Tavern Brawls, the player does battle using a constructed deck, usually of 30 cards, selected from the player's collection, using a mix of neutral cards available to all classes and specific class-based cards available to the chosen Hero. Each deck can only feature two of each card and only one of each Legendary rarity card. Legendary cards are the rarest cards in Hearthstone and are usually based on unique characters within the Warcraft universe. Arena play features no such limitations on the number of regular or Legendary cards but requires players to play using a new deck chosen from a series of randomly generated selections.

After release, Blizzard has adopted a "Year" moniker to identify when expansions have been retired from Standard format; the first, "Year of the Kraken", lasting from April 2016 to March 2017, retired the "Curse of Naxxramas" and "Goblins vs Gnomes" expansions, while the "Year of the Mammoth", starting in April 2017, retired the "Blackrock Mountain", "The Grand Tournament" and "League of Explorers" sets. The "Year of the Mammoth" Standard set also moved some Classic cards to the "Hall of Fame" set that is not playable in Standard but still can be obtained through card drops and available to play in Wild format. As some of these cards were class-specific, Blizzard plans to add new class-specific cards to the Classic set that are less powerful but similar to the ones moved to the Hall of Fame. These cards are expected to be added in the future.

Since the introduction of the "Year of the Kraken", decks are built either to the Standard or Wild format. Standard decks may be played in either format, but Wild decks can only be played in the Wild format. Wild format decks can use any cards within the Hearthstone library, limited by regular deck construction rules. Alternatively, the Standard format limits cards to those in the Basic and Classic set, and from any newer expansions that are those released within the last two years. Cards from previous expansions cannot be used except in Wild formats, however, as of December 2019, Wild format card packs and  adventures can be purchased via the in-game shop for gold or players may still purchase them from the in-game or online store for real money. The Standard format was added to help improve competitiveness for new players while helping to maintain a dynamic metagame.

The construction of a player's deck is a key strategic element in the game, determining which cards are available during a match. The game gives each player a pre-made deck for each Hero using the game's Core cards, allowing them to get a quick start in the game. The game provides a few deck recipes for each hero that are based on various successful deck archetypes and it populates the deck with the cards a player already owns. Hearthstone offers a deck construction helper to guide new players on selecting a good range of card types and values, or to finish off decks that are partially completed. The player has the ability to create up to eighteen custom decks, increased from the nine initially available before the release of the Whispers of the Old Gods expansion. Since the June 2017 patch, players have been able to share the composition of their deck with others via a unique code generated in-game.

Card library and crafting

On release, the game consisted of the same Basic set of cards that all players begin with and earn through leveling up all the individual heroes. All additional cards are generally gained by winning or buying card packs in the game; each card pack consists of five random cards. On Hearthstones release, purchased cards and packs would be from the Classic set, while with the release of each expansion or adventure, cards and packs from that expansion could also be gained. , there were 1729 unique collectible cards in the game, with more planned to be added in the future through expansion packs. Not all cards in the game are collectible in a player's library, as some cards are created as effects from other cards or spells, while others are unique to a specific Adventure or Tavern Brawl game mode. The former is comparable to Magic: the Gatherings tokens. Each card is classified as neutral or specific to one of the ten classes; with the introduction of Mean Streets of Gadgetzan, tri-class cards were added, meaning the card can be used by three different classes.

Players can purchase card packs within the game or through Blizzard's storefront. Players can purchase packs from any of the currently available expansions for Standard and Wild play, as well as packs that include cards from all Standard, Wild, or Classic format expansions. A single pack costs 100 gold coins (in-game currency); alternatively, players can purchase multiple packs at a time using real-world money with volume discounts; for example, two packs cost $2.99 (€2.99 or £2.99) while 60 packs cost $59.99 (€69.99 or £59.99). All cards in a card pack are randomly selected from the given card pack expansion with one card guaranteed to be of Rare or higher rarity. A Legendary card is guaranteed to be in one of the first ten packs of an expansion opened by a player; subsequently, the regular card appearance rate occurs. A player is guaranteed to not open a Legendary card that they already own unless they already own all Legendary cards in a card pack's set.

Additionally, players can use the crafting system to create new cards. The system uses arcane dust to craft specific cards. Arcane dust can be obtained by destroying existing cards, from arena and duels mode rewards or from the end of season rewards. Because cards can be used in more than one of the player's constructed decks, a player only needs a maximum of two copies of any regular card or one copy of a Legendary card in their collection, and the game can automatically convert extras into arcane dust. The crafting system was created as an alternative to the player card trading prevalent in trading card games such as Magic: The Gathering, with no plans for cards to be traded between players. Similar to the foils found in physical collectible card games, Hearthstone features golden cards that are special versions of regular cards featuring a golden border and unique animations. These cards are less common than the regular ones and are worth more arcane dust. Golden cards differ from their regular counterparts purely cosmetically and are intended to allow players to show off their special cards to others. Starting in 2021, new diamond versions of select Legendary cards, featuring animated art from community members of the card's character appearing to burst out of the card's frame, will be available to purchase or earned through a seasonal pass.

Game modes
Eight game modes are available to play in Hearthstone. Matches in all modes except for Solo Adventures count towards quest completion; Friendly Challenges initially did not count towards quest completion except during limited periods, but a game update in June 2017 allowed these matches to add another way to complete the daily quests. Duels also initially didn't count for most quests, but that was changed in a subsequent update.Hearthstone, formerly called Play, mode allows players to match up against human opponents of similar skill. Players can choose to play casual games, or take part in the ranked play system, earning ranks to reflect their skill and standing within the community over month-long seasons. In general, winning a ranked game earns a star towards progression to the next rank, while losing a game may lose a star; 3 stars are necessary to move to the next ranks. Participation in ranked play can earn players special cosmetic rewards. Blizzard has awarded a new card back at the end of each season for reaching a minimum with bonus rewards such as golden cards and arcane dust for reaching higher ranks.  After the release of WOG, Play mode matches can either use the Standard or Wild format, with separate Ranked play in each format. Standard format restricts decks to Basic and Classic cards, as well as any cards from sets released in the last two calendar years. The wild format allows decks to be made with no restrictions.
 Prior to the "Year of the Phoenix" (April 2020), the Ranked system was based on numeric tiers initially ranging from 25 to 1 (the lower value of the tier, the more skilled play it represents) and Legend, which employs a visible leaderboard for individual player rankings within the player's region. Stars won through matches can lead to both promotion or demotion through ranks, though stars cannot be lost in Ranks 50 to 21. Prior to February 2017, there were two "floors" in this ranking system, where players could not be demoted below once achieved, at Rank 20 and at Legend. A patch in February 2017 introduced three additional "floors" at Ranks 15, 10, and 5 in response to player criticism of the difficulty in moving up ranks with the shortness of each monthly season. In October 2018, Blizzard announced that they would add 25 new ranks, 50–26, for new players, and players can earn bonus card packs for reaching rank milestones. All ranks are reduced at the start of a new season (but cannot go past rank 25). 
 With the "Year of the Phoenix" in April 2020, the Ranked system has adapted a five-tier system consisting of Bronze, Silver, Gold, Platinum and Diamond, each with 10 ranks within them ranging from 10 to 1. Players in the top tier Diamond 1 can then be promoted to the Legend tier. New players to Heartstone start in an Apprentice League that has 40 ranks, during which no stars can be lost due to losing matches. In addition, ranks 10 and 5 within each tier are floors which players cannot fall below even if they lose further games. Similar rewards for rank milestones throughout these tiers were kept. At the end of the season, the player's position in the Ranked system gives them initial stars for the next season that may promote them from the base Bronze 10 level that all start at; for example, a player ending a season at Diamond 10 will earn 8 stars for the next season, placing them at Bronze 8.Solo Adventures are single-player modes against computer-controlled opponents that are either Practice matches or Adventures. In Practice mode, players can learn the basics of the game against easier opponents that only use basic cards in their decks, or more difficult ('expert') opponents that use a larger pool of cards. Players can also choose which class to play against. In Adventure mode, the player attempts to defeat bosses to unlock new cards or defeat that game mode. The boss encounters feature unique dialogue elements. For example, "Curse of Naxxramas" was divided into five sections ("wings"). Each section was purchasable as a one-time transaction for 700 gold or real-world equivalent, with future sections locked until the previous sections were completed. One of the adventures includes the Book of Heroes that tells the story of each hero and rewards a hero-themed pack upon completion; this mode is available for free.Arena mode allows the player to select one of three random heroes and draft a deck of 30 cards by choosing between three random cards at a time. Players use their drafted deck to compete in a series of games against other arena players, generally matched against decks with an equivalent win–loss record. Each arena run lasts until the player has reached three losses or twelve wins, at which point they earn rewards determined by the total number of games won. While constructed decks have limits on the number of copies of the same card in a single deck (two), arena decks have no such limits. Access to a single Arena run (drafting a deck and playing until it reaches the win or loss limit) requires a purchase of an Arena Ticket which costs either 150 gold or real-world money of $1.99 (€1.99 or £1.99). Prior to the "Year of the Mammoth" updated in 2017, Arena mode ran under the Wild format, allowing any card to be potentially offered during the deck construction process; with the 2017 update, Arena mode will be limited to Standard format, and will also see altered card distributions from normal play, making neutral cards less common and increasing the chances for the rarer class-specific cards to be offered during Arena deck construction.Tavern Brawl mode features one-on-one matches with another player. These commonly are competitive matches to defeat the other player, but some matches have featured cooperative goals such as jointly defeating a powerful minion. These matches force players to deal with a set of specific guidelines, which change on a weekly basis. Playing matches in this mode is restricted to players that have at least one level 20 hero character. The reward for the first time a match is won during a weekly brawl is normally one Year of the Phoenix pack.Battlegrounds was introduced in 2019, and is based on the auto battler genre and allows for up to eight players to compete. At the start of the match, each player selects one of three random heroes. On each round, players have a limited amount of coins to recruit minions to add to their side, as well the ability to sideline minions for later replacement or remove minions. After recruiting, players are paired off into battles; all minions from both sides of each battle fight automatically by the computer until one player losses all their minions, allowing the other hero to damage theirs. Players then return to recruit additional minions, repeating this to try to knock out the other heroes and be the last one standing.Friendly Play or "Friendly Challenge", allows players to challenge friends on their Battle.net friends list in unranked matches. Duels, was released in November 2020, is a combination of constructed and Dungeon runs, where the player picks one of four classes then constructs a deck of 16 cards and after each match chooses three cards to add to their deck from three different choices, similar to Dungeon Run. The end condition is the same as Arena mode. Mercenaries''', released in October 2021, is turn-based mode that will have its own card pack, each card representing a minion that can be leveled up as it is used in play. This mode is compared to a role-playing game, similar to the Pokémon series. A player forms a party of six of these minions prior to going on one of several bounties. Each bounty has a series of encounters that are procedurally generated. Each encounter, the player selected three minions to engage opponents; minions and enemies have strengths and weaknesses to other types based on a "rock paper scissors" cycle. On each turn of the encounter, a player designates what attack or abilities each deployed minion will do that turn to attempt to eliminate the opposing enemies. Minions or enemies that are eliminated may be replaced by others if there are more available to the player or opponent; for the player, any downed minion will remain unavailable for the rest of the bounty. Completing each encounter permanently levels up the minions and unlock new abilities, and provide temporary rewards for the duration of the bounty. After completing the bounty, the player can then use its rewards in the central hub, the Minion Village, to further level up a minion's abilities to make them stronger in battle. Besides the single-player bounties, a player can challenge another player with a team of minions in a player-versus-player mode.

Additionally, the game features a tutorial that is a limited starting experience designed to introduce players to Hearthstone, in which the player is matched against a series of computer-controlled opponents that includes dialogue elements. The tutorial may be played only once by an account per Battle.net region.

Players gain a quest daily and weekly, and can store up to three daily or weekly quests that can be completed to earn in-game experience or other rewards. The requirements of these quests are based on the cumulative performance in matches, typically requiring the player to win multiple matches with certain hero classes, destroy a number of minions, damage opposing heroes, observe a friend winning a game, playing a certain number of a particular type of card or other similar tasks. Progress towards completing quests typically can only be achieved through game modes with random matchmaking (Play or Arena), but Blizzard has offered periods where other play modes, such as duels, count and in June 2017 made duels always count for quest completion. A player can "reroll" one quest once per day to get a different one. With the "Year of the Mammoth" introduction, Blizzard has added log-in rewards and other meta-game elements occasionally.

In November 2020, Blizzard introduced the Tavern Pass to augment the quest system. The Tavern Pass is effectively a battle pass system, through which players earn points by completing daily and weekly quests as well as through playing matches in any game mode. Earning enough points within the Tavern Pass unlocks various rewards including individual cards, booster packs, in-game gold, and other features. Players can optionally buy into a paid tier that provides additional cosmetic rewards atop these items as well as increased experience gain that helps complete the pass faster. The Tavern Pass rotates with each new expansion.

Game regionsHearthstone offers play in four different geographical regions: Americas, Europe, Asia and China. Players can only compete and communicate with other players within the same region. While each player is by default assigned to a region loosely corresponding to their registered country of residence, players are able to switch regions within the Battle.net launcher, allowing them to play against those from other regions if they wish, although players from other regions are unable to select the China region for play on the same device. Each region holds a separate profile for each player, and it is not possible to transfer cards, gold or other details between regions. Players wishing to play in a new region must begin the game from the start, including replaying the tutorial and restarting their card collection.

Expansions and adventures
Blizzard has expanded Hearthstone roughly three times a year by the addition of expansions and adventures. Most expansions present more than 100 new cards to Hearthstone developed around a theme or gameplay concept; once released, players can purchase or win card packs with cards from the available expansions to add to their library. With the "Darkmoon Races", a mini-set expansion that builds upon prior expansions featuring a smaller number of cards was also introduced. Mini-sets are typically released in the half-way point between the release of two full expansions. Adventures used to be prevalent additions among expansions, but have been phased out in favor of mini-sets. The last adventure "Galakrond's Awakening" was released in January 2020. Adventures represent fewer new cards like mini-sets, typically a few dozens, which are only gained by winning specially designed matches against computer opponents in the single-player mode. Access to an adventure requires payment with in-game gold or real-world money. All adventures have multiple "wings" that could be completed.

Since the "Year of the Mammoth", which began with Journey to Un'Goro in 2017, there were no future more adventure card set releases. Instead, the game included freely-available single-player missions, similar to those in adventures, to earn card packs from that expansion. However, in the "Year of the Dragon", starting in April 2019, there were be additional single-player modes that with paid content, separate from expansion pack releases. While structured similar to Adventures, there were several "wings" to process through, the approach was closer to the "Kobolds & Catacombs" Monster Hunt or "The Witchwood" Dungeon Run in that players made choices related to their hero and deck over the course of several battles through each wing. Rewards from these single-player modes were card packs from the associated expansion by completing individual battles, so one could possibly earn more new cards by completing the single-player modes than by simply buying new packs directly.

Starting in January 2021, the Madness at the Darkmoon Faire set and subsequent sets have included a mini-set of 35 cards that expanded that set. Mini-sets are considered to be a part of their parent expansion, and mini-set cards can be opened from the same card packs as their preceding expansion.

As of August 2022, there have been 21 expansions, five mini-sets, and six adventures that include collectible cards.

Basic, Classic, Reward, Hall of Fame, and Core
Prior to the removal of these sets, all new players to Hearthstone acquired over 130 cards in the Basic card set to start playing with so they have enough cards to assemble decks for each of the ten classes. The Classic card set was generally class-specific cards that were not associated with any expansion and card parks could always be purchased in the game's store or won as rewards. Basic and Classic cards were playable in both Standard and Wild formats, and were not rotated out of Standard play from Hearthstone's launch until March 2021, as with cards from other expansions. Over time, some cards were retired to a separate Hall of Fame, taking them out of Standard play format but remaining available for Wild play and being obtained by crafting. Any class-specific Classic cards retired in this manner were eventually replaced with new Classic cards for that class to prevent class card-count imbalances.

At the start of "Year of the Dragon" in April 2019, two legendaries from The Witchwood set that powers up the hero power, Genn Greymayne and Baku the Mooneater, as well as four cards that synergize with those cards, were moved to the Hall of Fame so those cards left the Standard set a year earlier than normal. Prior to the year moniker system, the Reward set consisted of four cards that could only be obtained by completing meta-game achievements in Hearthstone, such as by collecting at least one copy of every "murloc" card in the Basic and Classic sets. 

In March 2021, the Basic, Classic and Hall of Fame sets were removed, and cards from those sets were combined into the Legacy set, which can be only used in Wild. The base set of Hearthstone changed from being composed of the Basic and Classic sets to a new set, called Core. The Core set typically features over 200 cards at a time, and includes cards from the Legacy set and other expansions, and it is immediately unlocked for free for all players. 

At the same time as the removal of the Classic set, a new format with the same name was added. In the Classic format, players get to play the game as it existed in June 2014.

Curse of Naxxramas
The adventure "Curse of Naxxramas" was announced on April 11, 2014, and then was released on July 22. It includes 15 bosses and nine class challenges that together award 30 cards, which includes six legendaries, and an exclusive card back if all heroic bosses are defeated. "Curse of Naxxramas" was developed to focus on a specific gameplay mechanic, with the team settling onto exploring the design space around the "deathrattle" keyword. This led to the narrative of the player having to explore a location filled with ghosts and undead creatures to take advantage of deathrattle effects. Since it was a single-player adventure, the team also developed bosses that would be far different from typical human opponents, including some boss characters that would break the fundamental rules of the game. Lead artist Ben Thompson said that they made it felt like winning against these bosses was something that the player earned, as well as helping the player to learn new tricks they could use in regular play modes.

Goblins vs Gnomes
The expansion Goblins vs Gnomes, was announced at BlizzCon on November 7, 2014, and then it was released on December 8. The expansion includes 123 cards found in its specific card pack. Pricing for the packs are the same as Classic packs. "Goblins vs Gnomes" was the first large expansion, and rather than roll out cards as they did with Curse of Naxxramas, they felt their goal with this "was ‘let’s make a bunch of cards that will really go in and just blow up the meta all at once,’ and we'll see how it goes, and maybe that’ll affect how we do things in the future," according to Chu. A central theme was designed around the "Mech" tribe cards that would interact with cards that represent goblins and gnomes.

Blackrock Mountain
The adventure "Blackrock Mountain" was announced at Pax East on March 6, 2015, and the first wing was released on April 2; the other four wings were opened weekly thereafter. It includes 17 bosses and nine class challenges that together awards 31 cards, which includes five Legendary cards, and an exclusive card back if all heroic bosses are defeated. "Blackrock Mountain" was designed as to help support players that wanted to construct dragon-themed decks. Dragon cards in Hearthstone are generally expensive to cast and thus only appear in the latter part of a match, making such decks weaker in the opening rounds. With "Blackrock Mountain", the team introduced cards that interacted with dragon cards, such as by having special effects when a minion is summoned while having a dragon card in hand.

The Grand Tournament
The expansion The Grand Tournament was announced on July 22, 2015, and was released on August 24; the set includes 132 cards found in its specific card pack, which costs the same as previous card packs.The Grand Tournament Arrives August 24 Retrieved August 19, 2015. The Grand Tournament was developed with a new card mechanic for minions called "Joust" which has combat between a minion with Joust with other minions based on the casting cost of the minions, rather than their attack and health. Donais noted that while this also created a central theme for The Grand Tournament expansion, it also served to help combat "aggro" decks—decks filled with low-cost minions that could be quickly deployed—which at the time of the expansion's release, were extremely popular and found to be discouraging to many players. The Grand Tournament also introduced the "Inspire" mechanic for minions, which would create some effect for the minion each time the player used their Hero power, often including cumulative effects over several turns. Donais said the Inspire keyword came about looking at how to interact with Hero powers better, and while Inspire-based cards could be slow and at risk, could have great payoffs if used properly.

League of Explorers
The adventure League of Explorers was announced at BlizzCon 2015 on November 6, 2015, and the first wing was released on November 12; the other three wings were opened weekly with a week-long break after the second wing. It includes 13 bosses and nine class challenges that together awards 45 cards, which includes five legendaries, and an exclusive card back if all heroic bosses are defeated. League of Explorers was the team's first attempt to craft a narrative that allowed Hearthstone to stand on its own from the Warcraft universe even though it may still borrow concepts from it from time to time. The adventure borrows from dungeons in desert locations within World of Warcraft but transform the experience to be one of an adventuring archaeologist, and the challenges were more themed around puzzles and traps that the dungeons would present rather than just boss characters. Central to League of Explorers was the new "Discover" mechanic, which when activated would have the game randomly select up to three cards with specific characteristics from all available game cards, allowing them to select one card to put into their hand. This mechanic was introduced to provide contrast to decks that focused on card draws, which they found out tend to be played in the same manner over time. The Discover mechanic allowed decks to be more random but provide some player decision for on-the-spot judgement calls depending on the situation.

Whispers of the Old Gods
The expansion Whispers of the Old Gods was announced on March 11, 2016, and was released on April 26; the set includes 134 cards found in its specific card pack, which costs the same as previous card packs.Whispers of the Old Gods Creeps into Action on April 26! - News - Hearthstone Blizzard, April 19, 2016 Whispers of the Old Gods was based on creating a theme around mysterious and dark Lovecraftian horror, such as Cthulhu, to contrast to the high adventure and excitement that they had designed with "League of Explorers". This concept of crafting powerful god-like characters let them brainstorm on wild ideas for cards that may seem overpowered for the game but that would fit the theme. Central to the expansion is the Legendary "C'Thun" Old God card, which can be buffed by effects from 16 other cards, disciples of C'Thun, that were part of the expansion, regardless of where the C'Thun card was currently at. Donais explained this helped to create a "sense of dread" in opponents that fit the theme they wanted. Because of this, all players received the C'Thun card and one of the disciple cards for free once the expansion was released. "Whispers" also allowed the designers to take old favorite cards and make "corrupted" versions of them within the flavor of the theme.

One Night in Karazhan
The adventure "One Night in Karazhan" was announced on July 29, 2016, and the first wing was released on August 11; the other three wings were opened weekly thereafter. There are four wings along with a free prologue mission that awards two cards. Kara includes 13 bosses and nine class challenges that together awards 45 cards, which includes five legendaries, and an exclusive card back if all heroic bosses are defeated. "One Night in Karazhan" is based on a popular game location in World of Warcraft, featuring an abandoned mage's tower that is often used for a dungeon raid. The adventure features eleven boss characters that are also in the World of Warcraft raid of the tower. The team had designed the concept of this expansion alongside "Curse of Naxxramas" early in Hearthstones post-release and was considered to be their first adventure, but they ultimately used Naxxramas, as Karazhan was being used for other activities by teams within Blizzard at that time. Instead, when they looked towards designing it, they found Priest decks had difficulty in staying current with the meta-game, so several of the cards introduced with this set were to help make the Priest a more viable class with the shifts in popular decks.

Mean Streets of Gadgetzan
The expansion Mean Streets of Gadgetzan was announced at BlizzCon 2016 on November 4, 2016, and was released on December 1; the set includes 132 cards found in its specific card pack. Mean Streets of Gadgetzan was originally envisioned to have the spirit of "cops and robbers", according to designer Matt Place and art director Ben Thompson, but the idea transformed into squarely focusing on the crime aspects, and treating the narrative as three principal mafia-like crime families vying for control of the city of Gadgetzan along with a number of small-time criminals that work as hired hands. The nine hero archetypes were divided into sets of three that each worked for a different family, which led to the creation of tri-class specific cards. Each of the three families was given a central mechanic theme: the Grimy Goons buff cards that in a player's hand, the Jade Lotus improve new Jade Golem cards the more they are played, and the Kabal use Discover cards to use certain cards from outside a player's deck. The set includes Legendary cards that represent the leader of each family.

Journey to Un'Goro
The expansion Journey to Un'Goro was announced on February 27, 2017, and was released on April 6; it contains 135 cards found in its specific card pack. Journey to Un'Goro is based around a pre-historic theme and introduces dinosaurs and the Elemental tribe, including retroactively making some previously released minions as part of the tribe. It introduces Legendary spells with the "Quest" keyword, which award a unique minion or spell when the conditions of the quest are fulfilled. If a Quest card is in the player's deck it will be put into the player's opening hand, although players are allowed to mulligan it, and it must be put into play before the player can start completion of that quest. The expansion also adds the "Adapt" keyword to some minions and spells, which allows the player to select a buff to apply to one or more minions.

Knights of the Frozen Throne
The expansion Knights of the Frozen Throne was announced on July 6, 2017, and was released on August 10. The set's theme is about the frozen wastes of Northrend and Icecrown Citadel, and the set features the game's heroes embracing the power of the Undead Scourge, becoming Death Knights in the service of the Lich King. The expansion features the introduction of hero cards, an entirely new card type that transforms the player's hero and hero power along with varying unique effects, and the Lifesteal mechanic. It features 135 cards and includes adventure-like missions for single-players, featuring a narrative leading to a boss fight with the Lich King that can reward one random Legendary death knight card, multiple card packs and for dedicated players an alternate hero for Paladin - Arthas. The expansion introduced the Lifesteal keyword; when minions or spells with this keyword deal damage the controlling hero is healed by the same amount.

Kobolds & Catacombs
The expansion Kobolds & Catacombs was announced in November 2017 during BlizzCon 2017 and was released on December 7, 2017. The general concept of the expansion was around the idea of dungeon crawls from role-playing games. Its 135 cards are themed around exploring old catacombs under Azeroth and uncovering valuable treasures. Among the cards include Legendary weapons for each class that includes classes that have never had weapons before, Spellstone cards that require the player to achieve certain objectives in-game to upgrade the card, "Unidentified" item cards that offer a random effect alongside a known effect, and cards with a "Recruit" keyword that allow the player to summon minions directly from their deck that meet the card's requirements. All players received the Legendary minion Marin the Fox a month ahead of time and after the set was released, one random Legendary weapon card. Earlier in 2017, Blizzard had planned for this set's theme to be around Warcrafts Blingtron robots and would have been known as "Blingtron's Lootapolooza". While this theme still centered around dungeons and loot, they decided that the set would have better flavor and easier art to design by switching the theme to kobolds; however, this decision came after they started some of the promotional material, so some of the art includes Blingtrons.

The expansion introduces a new single-player mode called a "Dungeon Run", a roguelike-style format. The goal for the player is to complete battles against eight boss characters randomly selected from a pool of 48 that become more progressively difficult. The player starts by selecting a class, which gains them a small deck of cards for that class. For each boss they defeat, the player gains additional starting health in the next battle, a choice of three sets of three randomly selected cards around a theme, and in some cases, a unique treasure card otherwise not available in the normal game modes. Should the player be defeated by a boss, that run is ended, and the player must start a run anew. Cards from the Dungeon Run do not become part of the player's library, though players can earn card packs through quests involving Dungeon Runs, and can earn a unique card back by completing runs with all nine classes. The idea for the Dungeon Run is based on the expansion's theme and the mode works as an optional single-player experience independent of the card collection of the player.

The WitchwoodThe Witchwood was announced in March 2018 as the first expansion in the Year of the Raven and was released on April 12, 2018. It is themed around a spooky forest next to the cursed city of Gilneas from Warcraft. The expansion adds two new keywords; "Echo" cards can be played as many times on a turn as long as the player has the mana to pay the cost, while minions with "Rush" can immediately attack the opponent's minions on the turn they are summoned. The set also features cards that give a special effect if a player's deck only contains even-cost cards or odd-cost cards, effectively limiting players to only half of their card collection in assembling decks to take advantage of these cards.

The expansion adds a single-player mode called "Monster Hunt", an evolved version of Kobolds & Catacombss "Dungeon Run", which became available to play two weeks after the expansion was released. In the "Monster Hunt", players pick between four unique heroes that have a unique hero power and unique cards. After defeating each encounter, players pick between three sets of cards to improve their deck and occasionally earn special cards or an ability to improve their hero power; there are over 45 encounters. Players can earn a unique card back, which requires defeating eight bosses of increasing difficulty, with each of the four heroes, and then defeating the final boss, Hagatha the Witch.

The Boomsday ProjectThe Boomsday Project was announced in July 2018 and was released on August 7, 2018. The set focuses on "Mech" characters and abilities, similar to Goblins & Gnomes, and is themed around the minion Dr. Boom that was introduced in the former set, having set up a villainous laboratory in the Netherstorm. The set introduced the new "Magnetic" keyword, which allows a player to use a card as a buff if the "magnetic" card is played to the left of a mech, and as a stand-alone minion otherwise. The Magnetic mechanic had originally been designed as "Modular", whereby playing a card would either allow the player to select from two effects: playing it as a spell atop a mech or as its own minion. The developers found this could lead to long turns if a player's deck primarily consisted of such cards, to the point they had been ready to cut the keyword and release the set otherwise. However, they found a solution through the user interface by letting the player make the choice at the same time as playing the card if they placed it in a specific location near a mech. The Boomsday Project is also the first expansion to have legendary spell cards for each class. 

In June 2019, a number of cards from The Boomsday Project received buffs, such as increasing the strength or health of minions or reduce the casting cost of various cards. This is the first major buff to cards since the game's release in 2014. In addition, a new neutral Legendary minion card was added to the set and a golden copy of it was given free to all players for a limited time.

The set also includes a single player mode called the Puzzle Lab, which presents more than 100 Hearthstone-based puzzles where players are given a pre-determined game state and must attempt to complete a given objective. The puzzles are split among these four different objectives: Lethal, where players must win the match during their turn; Mirror, which requires the player to match the minion battlefield on both sides; Board Clear, where the battlefield must be cleared of minions; and Survival, requiring the player to survive until the next turn. The Puzzle Lab was released two weeks after the expansion's release. Players who complete all the Puzzle Lab missions will be rewarded with a card back.

Rastakhan's Rumble
The Rastakhan’s Rumble was announced during Blizzcon 2018 and was released on December 4, 2018. The expansion is centered around nine troll teams coming to battle in an arena to gain favor with their animal spirits known as "Loa" and King Rastakhan, the ruler of the ancient Zandalari Empire. Each troll team represents one of the nine classes in the game, and in addition to other cards, each class will get a Legendary minion card representing the Loa, and a Spirit card that has synergy with the class's Loa card. A new keyword "Overkill" triggers an effect if more damage is done than needed to eliminate an opposing minion. A new solo mode, Rumble Run, will also be available with this expansion that follows the story of a young troll combatant seeking glory in the arena.

Rise of ShadowsRise of Shadows was announced in February 2019 before being formally revealed for its April 9, 2019 release as the first expansion in the Year of the Dragon. Rise is themed around numerous villains from previous expansions gathering to form the League of E.V.I.L.: Arch-Thief Rafaam (League of Explorers), Madam Lazul (Whispers of the Old Gods), King Togwaggle (Kobolds & Catacombs), Hagatha the Witch (The Witchwood), and Dr. Boom (The Boomsday Project) and then pulling off a heist in Dalaran. Cards from this expansion will have mechanics that are similar to the past expansions. New card keywords include scheme, spells that increases its effectiveness after each turn that it remains in a player's hand, twinspell, spells that leaves a copy of itself in a player's hand after using it for the first time, and lackeys, a specific set of minions that are generated by other cards that are 1/1 in power with a differing battlecry.Rise of Shadows includes a solo adventure mode called "The Dalaran Heist", formatted similar to the Monster Hunt and Dungeon Run, though it requires the player to pay for four of the five chapters with in-game gold or with real money; it was released on May 16, 2019. At the start of a run in a chapter, the player selects one of nine minions, which align with the game's standard classes, and fights through eight bosses of increasing difficulty, gaining rewards and additional cards to fill their deck. A new feature includes points during this ascension where the player can do a small bit of deck manipulation, such as removing a card, adding a card, or adding a bonus boost to a card in the next match it is played. Completing certain achievements within the challenge can unlock alternate class powers or different starting decks. Completing a chapter's boss successfully grants Rise card packs, and completing all five chapters gives additional bonus rewards including card backs.

Saviors of UldumSaviors of Uldum was announced on July 1, 2019, released on August 6. Thematically it follows after events of Rise of Shadows, where Rafaam and the League of E.V.I.L. have stolen the floating city of Dalaran and have moved it to the Uldum desert. The expansion also links to the previous League of Explorers, with the main four heroes from that expansion poised to battle Rafaam and his allies. Among new additions include cards with keywords "Reborn" that bring back dead minions but with one health and "Plague" spells that affect all minions on the battlefield equally. Legendary Quest Cards, last used in Journey to Un'Goro, were reintroduced for each of the nine classes.

The single-player campaign, called Tombs of Terror, was released on September 17, 2019. Tombs of Terror has five chapters, each requiring the player to pay for three (first and final ones are free) of the five chapters with in-game gold or with real money. Each chapter ends with a final boss with additional health compared to regular bosses except the final boss's health is persistent between attempts. Beating all four of these bosses unlocks the final chapter. Players play with dual-class heroes so they can use cards from two classes. Defeating five bosses in each chapter awards three Saviors of Uldum packs and completing all chapters awards a golden classic pack and card back.

Descent of DragonsDescent of Dragons was announced at BlizzCon 2019 and was released on December 10, 2019. The expansion features the keyword Invoke that when played will use the Galakrond hero power and power up the Galakrond card in a player's deck, as well as Side Quests that are easier to complete when compared to the legendary quests. The expansion includes a solo adventure, the fifth one released, called "Galakrond's Awakening" that was first released on January 21, 2020; it features separate stories of the League of E.V.I.L. and the League of Explorers facing off until they reach a final showdown and it includes an additional 35 cards and two card backs (if the heroic mode is defeated) for players to collect.

Demon Hunter InitiateDemon Hunter Initiate was a set released on April 2, 2020, shortly before the release of Ashes of Outland. This set is made entirely of demon hunter cards in order assist with card parity with existing classes since it was the first new class added to the game since the original release in 2014. Once the Initiate set rotated out of standard in 2021, the development team added some of the rotating demon hunter cards to the Classic set.

Ashes of OutlandAshes of Outland was announced on March 17, 2020, and was released on April 7, 2020; it is the first expansion of the Year of the Phoenix and introduces the first new hero class in the game's history, the Demon Hunter, bringing the total number of classes to ten. The Demon Hunter's hero power Demon Claws is a one mana cost power to give a +1 attack bonus to the hero. Several of the Demon Hunter class cards introduce the Outcast keyword which triggers an effect if the card is in the far left or right of the player's hand, thus requiring the player to play cards in a specific order to gain that effect. In addition, the set's release included a rework of the Priest class's basic and classic set, replacing some of its cards with new ones as to provide the class with lower-mana support cards that had been lacking and leading to the class struggling against other classes and as well as moving some of the Priest cards to the Hall of Fame that do not fit the class identity.

Scholomance AcademyScholomance was released on August 6, 2020. The set includes dual-class cards, similar to the three-class concept introduced in “Mean Streets” but limited to two classes. A new mechanic for minions was introduced called Spellburst, it triggers an effect just once after playing a spell. Each class has a Study Spell, letting players Discover a card of a certain type, as well as reducing the mana cost of the next card of the type discovered.

Madness at the Darkmoon FaireMadness at the Darkmoon Faire was released on November 17, 2020. The set features cards inspired by the World of Warcraft monthly event known as the Darkmoon Faire and also includes the return of the Old Gods in new versions; these Gods were last seen in the Whispers set. The set includes a new keyword called Corrupt where if a player plays a card of higher cost while a Corrupt card is in hand, the card becomes corrupted which activates bonus effects. Darkmoon Races' is Hearthstones first mini-set and it builds upon the Madness at the Darkmoon Faire expansion, featuring 35 new cards and was released on January 21, 2021. While the cards can be obtained through the Madness card packs, it is the first set of cards in which players can purchase the complete set (including duplicates of each non-Legendary card) in one purchase from Blizzard.

Core 2021 
At the start of "Year of Gryphon" on March 30, 2021, all players were immediately able to use all 235 cards within the Core set for free. This set replaced the Classic and Basic sets that were previously used in Standard mode. It includes 30 new cards and the remaining consists of cards selected from Basic, Classic, various Wild sets, and the Demon Hunter Initiate set. The core set is planned to change each year. 

Forged at the Barrens
The first expansion of the "Year of the Gryphon" was Forged at the Barrens which was released on March 30, 2021. A new keyword "Frenzy" was added for abilities that minions evoke should they take and survive any form of damage. Additionally, cards that generate direct magic effects have now had those magic effects classified into one of six schools, such as Fire or Nature, with which Blizzard plans to build upon in the future expansions. Ten of the cards are designed as Legendary Mercenaries, which have a single-player content, known as the Book of Mercenaries, focused on them. The set was expanded when the second mini-set Wailing Caverns was released on June 3, 2021.

United in Stormwind
The second expansion of the "Year of the Gryphon" was United in Stormwind which was released on August 3, 2021. This set introduces two new keywords: "Tradeable" which are cards that can be played as normal or put back into the deck in order to draw another card and "Questline" cards that are three-part quests that after each part is completed gives a reward and if all three are completed a specific Legendary minion card is given. The set was expanded with the third mini-set called the "Deadmines" that was released on November 2, 2021.

Fractured in Alterac Valley
The third and final expansion of the "Year of the Gryphon" was Fractured in Alterac Valley which was on December 7, 2021. This set features the nine Mercenaries available as Hero Cards and the new keyword is Honorable Kill which gives a beneficial effect if destroying a minion with exact damage. The set release tasks the player with earning honor points by playing games and the faction winner, which was Alliance, awarded all players the diamond version of their faction's leader in February 2022. The set was expanded with the fourth mini-set called "Onyxia's Lair" which was released on February 15, 2022.

Core 2022 
At the start of "Year of Hydra" on April 12, 2022, all players will be immediately able to use any of the 250 cards within the Core set for free; this is the second version of the core set. At the start of the Year of Hydra, 57 cards will rotate that were in the Core 2021 set, while 72 cards replace those for Standard mode play. These 57 cards were part of previous sets and will still be able to play in Wild mode. Core sets are available to be used in any game mode.

Voyage to the Sunken City
The first expansion of the "Year of the Hydra", Voyage to the Sunken City was announced on March 17, 2022, and was released on April 12. The theme of this expansion is Zin-Azshari, an ancient city of elves that sank into the oceans of Azeroth. The elves survived by transforming themselves into undersea creatures called Naga. This set features a new minion type called Naga and a new keyword Colossal, which is a minion that summons another minion regardless of how the minion was brought into play. The set was expanded with the fifth mini-set called "Throne of the Tides" which was released on June 1, 2022.

Murder at Castle Nathria
The second expansion of the "Year of the Hydra", Murder at Castle Nathria was announced on June 27, 2022, and was released on August 2. The theme of this expansion is Revendreth, one of the Shadowlands, and the mystery behind the murder of its ruler, Sire Denathrius, during a party in his stronghold Castle Nathria. This set features a new keyword "Infuse", which transforms cards into more powerful versions of themselves as a specified number of friendly minions have died while the Infused card is in your hand. The expansion also introduces the second new card type addition after the hero cards in Knights of the Frozen Throne, Locations. Locations each have an ability that can be activated every other turn, and they depict different locations within Castle Nathria. This set was expanded upon with the sixth mini-set called "Maw and Disorder" which includes 35 cards that was released on September 27, 2022.

Path of Arthas
With the introduction of the Death Knight class, the second new hero added to the original game will get 26 cards from the "Path of Arthas" set, which can be either purchased from a money offer or by spending 2000 Gold. In addition to the 26 cards from this set, 32 cards are added to the Core Set that will be freely given after finishing Death Knight Prologue.

March of the Lich King
The third and final expansion of the "Year of the Hydra", March of the Lich King'' was announced on November 1, 2022, and will be released on December 6.  This set includes cards for the Death Knight class, adds a new minion type – Undead, adds a new card mechanic Manathirst that does something extra once a certain mana amount is reached and will include the keyword Reborn last used in the "Saviors of Uldum" expansion.

References

External links
 

Hearthstone
Warcraft
Gameplay of specific video games